Cyril C. Perera (3 June 1923 – 4 September 2016) was a Sri Lankan author of Sinhala literature who was well known for his translations of world literature into Sinhalese. His translations included novels, short stories, poems, stage plays, and children's literature.

Perera was born in Colombo and attended various schools there. He studied art, architecture, and building engineering at Colombo Technical College and later joined government service. He worked as a building designer in the Ministry of Health.

Publications

References

1923 births
2016 deaths
Sri Lankan male writers
Sri Lankan translators
Translators from English
Translators from German
Translators from Russian
People from Colombo
Sinhalese writers
Translators to Sinhalese
20th-century translators
21st-century translators
20th-century male writers